Mangifera similis is a species of plant in the family Anacardiaceae. It is endemic to Indonesia.

References

similis
Trees of Sumatra
Trees of Borneo
Vulnerable plants
Taxonomy articles created by Polbot